LITE (as Lite FM on radio) is one of Malaysia's English-language radio stations managed by Astro Radio, a subsidiary of Astro Holdings Sdn Bhd. The station mostly plays Classic hits from the 1960s, 1970s, 1980s and 1990s which targeting listeners between the age of 35 to 49. Unlike any other stations by Astro Radio, Lite have the lowest weekly listeners based on GfK Radio Audience Measurement (RAM), Wave 1 in June 2019, Lite dropped by 0.24% to 831k weekly listeners.

History 
Lite alongside sister channels Hitz and Mix was among the first privately owned English language radio stations to be broadcast in Malaysia was officially launched on 1 June 1996 as Light & Easy on Astro's audio-only channels since the launch of the satellite network and Light & Easy was launched into Malaysian FM airwaves on New Year's Day 1997 at midnight stroke MST and was officially new renamed "Lite FM" on 20 November 2006. Light & Easy opening on 1 June 1996 as oldies format focusing Golden Oldies songs mainly from the 1950s to the 1960s targeting an older audience above 50 years old. 

On 1 January 2018, the station (along with 10 other sister radio stations) dropped the suffix "FM" from its brand name as part of the Astro Radio's major rebranding project to focus on the digital platform. A new logo was also unveiled.

Beginning August 2021, Lite changed its radio jingles/sweepers on the radio to "Lite FM" (along with its sister stations, Hitz and Mix). Therefore, hinting that the radio station itself might go through another rebranding in the near future.

1950s music are occasionally heard again on the station due to strong demand from listeners wanting more golden tracks.

Lite adopts the classic hits radio format with the majority of the playlist consisting of classic hits music from the 1960s, 1970s, 1980s and 1990s.

On 19 August 2022, Lite FM changed the slogan to All-Time Favourites in conjunction with 25th anniversary of the station since it were officially launched in 1997. The music playlist have changed to play classic hits from the 1960s, 1970s, 1980s and 1990s.

Frequency

Internet radio 
Broadcast online on SYOK website and APP
Lite Acoustic
Lite Your 70's Favourites
Lite 80's Sing-along

Television satellite 
 Astro (television): Channel 854

Gallery

References

External links 
 

1996 establishments in Malaysia
Radio stations established in 1996
Radio stations in Malaysia